Cliff Hall (October 4, 1894 – October 7, 1972) was an American stage and radio comedian, best known for being a straight man to Jack Pearl's Baron Munchausen character.

Born Robert Clifford Hall in Brooklyn, he first got on stage in 1910 as part of the Cecil Spooner Stock Company.  He acted on stage, on radio, and on TV into the 1960s, until retiring in 1968.  He worked with Pearl on radio for 15 years, but they also partnered on vaudeville and in commercials for close to 30 years.  His last Broadway appearance with in 1967 in Sherry!   

His many TV appearances included playing the Raccoon Lodge President on The Honeymooners.  One of his last TV appearances was in a 1966 episode of Bewitched (Season 2, "A Bum Raps").

Hall also partnered as a straight man with others including Bert Lahr and Willie Howard.

Hall only had one eye, though that was not well-known, the result of an attack by a Canadian soldier on leave in 1942.  Hall was in the Navy in World War I, and an entertainer for troops during World War II.

References

External links

1894 births
1972 deaths
American male stage actors
Male actors from New York City